This overview lists flags used by first-level and second-level country subdivisions. The flags of country subdivisions exhibit a wide variety of regional influences and local histories, as well as widely different styles and design principles. For example, some Indonesian provincial flags features a coat of arms, due to many provincial coat of arms within the province used on their flag. Some Estonian county flags features the green and white background with the coat of arms of the county. Subdivision flags were not always ubiquitous. Many country subdivisions went decades without a flag, until a certain event or an independence or a formation of the country to adopt a creation of the flag. A panel then reviewed the five winning entries, choosing one to become the official subdivision flag. Western Australia's example is typical of the flag adoption processes that many subdivisions undertook with their flags. The 1,000th anniversary of Gloucestershire's founding also spurred the creation of a flag, in 2008. The status of these flags varies from one country or sovereign state to the next: most of them are official flags, whereas others are only used de facto, sometimes to indicate a desire for more autonomy or independence. Some flags, such as the flags of Leicestershire and Warwickshire, were created by the College of Arms in the United Kingdom.

Albania

Counties

Andorra

Parishes

Angola

Provinces

Antigua and Barbuda

Islands

Argentina

Armenia
Some Armenian provinces are known to have no flag, including Aragatsotn, Ararat, Armavir, Gegharkunik, and Kotayk Provinces.

Municipalities

Australia

Austria

States

Bahrain

Governorates

Former Governorates

Belarus

Belgium

Bolivia

Departments

Claimed department

Bosnia and Herzegovina

Brazil

Bulgaria

Provinces

Cape Verde

Municipalities

Canada

Provinces

Territories 

File:Flag of Yukon, Canada.svg|

Autonomous areas

Chile

Colombia

Comoros

Democratic Republic of the Congo

Provinces

Republic of the Congo

Departments

Costa Rica

Croatia

Cuba

Czech Republic

Czech lands

Regions

Denmark

Regions

Dominican Republic

Provinces

East Timor

Districts

Ecuador

Egypt

El Salvador

Departments

Former Department Flags

Equatorial Guinea

Islands

Estonia
Every county in Estonia has its own flag, either officially through adoption or through custom and usage. The flags of the 15 counties of Estonia are all white and green, with the coat of arms of the respective county on the white part. This design was first established in 1938.

Ethiopia

Fiji

Dependencies

Finland

France

Gabon

Provinces

Georgia

Germany

Greece

Regions and municipalities

Guatemala

Departments

Guinea-Bissau

Regions

Honduras

Departments

Hungary

India

Indonesia 
Many Indonesian provincial flags feature their coat of arms on a flag, incorporating elements from the coat of arms, itself based on the flags of the regencies and cities, into their designs.

Iraq

Ireland

Israel

Italy

Ivory Coast

Districts

Japan

Kazakhstan

Kenya

Kosovo

North Korea

Special Administrative Regions

South Korea

Kyrgyzstan

Latvia

Liberia

Lithuania

Liechtenstein

Municipalities

Luxembourg

Malaysia

Malta

Regions

Local councils

Marshall Islands

Atolls

Mauritius

Mexico

Federated States of Micronesia

Moldova

Districts

Autonomous Territorial Units

Former counties

Mongolia

Montenegro

Morocco

Mozambique

Provinces

Myanmar

Netherlands

New Zealand

Islands of the Cook Islands

Nicaragua

Departments

Autonomous Regions

Nigeria

North Macedonia

Norway

Pakistan

Palau

Panama

Provinces

Province-level Indigenous Regions

Corregimiento-level Indigenous Regions

Papua New Guinea

Paraguay

Departments

Peru

Philippines

Poland

Portugal

Puerto Rico

Romania

Counties

Russia

Saint Kitts and Nevis

Islands

Saint Vincent and the Grenadines

Islands

Samoa

Islands

San Marino
Every Sanmarinese municipal flags, such as those of Acquaviva, Borgo Maggiore, and Chiesanuova, feature design cues taken from the flag of San Marino. On the right is the municipality's name and the coat of arms.

Municipalities

São Tomé and Príncipe

Autonomous Region

Districts

Serbia

Autonomous provinces

Municipalities

Slovakia
All eight regions have flags.

Regions

Slovenia

Solomon Islands

Provinces

Capital Territory

Somalia

South Africa

South Sudan

Spain

Sri Lanka

Sudan

States

Traditional Kingdoms

Former provinces

Sweden

Switzerland

Syria

De facto autonomous area

Regions within the Autonomous Administration of North and East Syria

Taiwan

Tanzania

Autonomous Regions

Thailand

Tonga

Islands

Uganda

Districts

Traditional kingdoms

Historical

Ukraine

United Arab Emirates

United Kingdom

England

Scotland

Wales

Overseas territories

Saint Helena, Ascension and Tristan da Cunha

United States

Uruguay
Each departments in Uruguay has their own flag (with the exception of Tacuarembo Department).

Departments

Uzbekistan

Vanuatu

Provinces

Venezuela

Flags of Moroccan provinces claimed by Western Sahara

Historical

Yemen

Zimbabwe

Provinces

Historical states

Austria-Hungary

Confederate States of America

Former territories

Nguyễn dynasty

Ottoman Empire

Autonomous provinces/states

Provinces

Sharifate

Vilayet

Soviet Union

Yugoslavia

See also

 Flags of country subdivisions (Oceania)
 Gallery of sovereign state flags
 Flags of dependent territories
 Gallery of flags of dependent territories
 History of flags
 Flags of formerly independent states
 Cultural flags
 Flags of ethnic groups
 Flags of active autonomist and secessionist movements
 Lists of city flags
 Flags of micronations

Notes

 
 Country Sub
 Flag